Nathan Edward Shaw (born 22 November 2000) is an English professional footballer who plays as a midfielder for Inverness Caledonian Thistle.

Career
In 2018, Shaw was part of the Blackpool squad that reached the FA Youth Cup semi-finals. In June 2019, Shaw signed a professional contract with the club. On 3 September 2019, Shaw made his debut for Blackpool in a 5–1 EFL Trophy win against Morecambe.

On 19 February 2020, Shaw joined Bamber Bridge on loan for a month. Shaw scored on his debut for the club, grabbing the third in a 3–0 victory over F.C. United of Manchester. He would go on to appear in one more match before the season was ended due to the coronavirus pandemic.

He went out on another loan, this time to AFC Fylde, in October 2020. Initially until January, the loan was extended until the end of the 2020–21 season. He returned from the loan on 27 January, after the National League North was placed in suspension due to the COVID-19 pandemic.

On 8 March 2021, Shaw joined National League side Stockport County on loan for one month.

On 19 June 2022, Shaw joined Inverness Caledonian Thistle in the Scottish Championship.

Career statistics

References

2000 births
Living people
Association football midfielders
English footballers
Blackpool F.C. players
Bamber Bridge F.C. players
AFC Fylde players
Stockport County F.C. players
Inverness Caledonian Thistle F.C. players
National League (English football) players